This is the discography for Dutch electronic musician Headhunterz.

Releases 
(White labels are not listed)

Remixes

References 

Discographies of Dutch artists
Electronic music discographies